Omicron Boötis (ο Boötis) is a yellow-hued star in the northern constellation of Boötes.  With an apparent visual magnitude of +4.60, it is a fifth magnitude star that is visible to the naked eye. Based upon an annual parallax shift of 13.42 mas as seen from the Earth, it is located about 243 light years from the Sun. The star is moving closer to the Sun with a radial velocity of −9 km/s.

At the age of 2.72 billion years, this is an evolved G-type giant star with a stellar classification of G8.5 III. It belongs to the so-called "red clump", which indicates it is generating energy through helium fusion at its core. Although it displays a higher abundance of barium than is normal for a star of its type, Williams (1975) considers its status as a Barium star to be "very doubtful". The star has double the mass of the Sun and has expanded to 11 times the Sun's radius. It is radiating 85 times the Sun's luminosity from its enlarged photosphere at an effective temperature of 4,864 K.

References

External links
 
 

G-type giants
Horizontal-branch stars
Bootis, Omicron
Boötes
BD+17 2780
Bootis, 35
129972
072125
5502